PHV may refer to:

Patrick Henry Village, a United States Army installation at Heidelberg, Germany, 1947–2013
Pepper Huasteco virus
Pharmacovigilance
Plug-in hybrid vehicle
Pro hac vice, a legal term